HMS Scorpion was a 14-gun two-masted Merlin-class sloop of the Royal Navy, built by Wyatt and Major at Bucklers Hard on the Beaulieu River in Hampshire, England and launched on 8 July 1746.

She foundered in the Irish Sea in September 1762.

References

 McLaughlan, Ian. The Sloop of War 1650-1763. Seaforth Publishing, 2014. .
 Rif Winfield (2007). British Warships in the Age of Sail, 1714-1792: Design, Construction, Careers and Fates. Seaforth Publishing. .

Sloops of the Royal Navy
1746 ships
Ships built on the Beaulieu River